Quincy Lamont Williams (born August 17, 1984), known by his stage name Peewee Longway, is an American rapper best known for his mixtape The Blue M&M and his collaboration with Young Thug, "Loaded". He was also a member of the rap group "Felix Brothers", alongside Gucci Mane and Young Dolph.

Discography

Albums

Studio albums

Mixtapes

Singles

As lead artist

Promotional singles

As featured artist

Guest appearances

References

Living people
African-American male rappers
Southern hip hop musicians
1984 births
21st-century American rappers
21st-century American male musicians
21st-century African-American musicians
20th-century African-American people